Miwa Sasaki (born 20 May 1995) is a Japanese professional footballer who plays as a forward for WE League club Nojima Stella Kanagawa Sagamihara.

Club career 
Sasaki made her WE League debut on 12 September 2021.

References 

Japanese women's footballers
1995 births
Living people
Women's association football forwards
Association football people from Miyagi Prefecture
Sportspeople from Sendai
Nojima Stella Kanagawa Sagamihara players
WE League players